Read Only Memory is an EP by the American rock band Chrome, released in 1979 by Siren Records. It was reissued in 2014 by Cleopatra Records.

Track listing

Original release

2014 reissue
The 2014 Cleopatra reissue combined both original sides onto side A and added four bonus tracks, recorded from a live performance in Italy in 1981, on side B.

Personnel
Helios Creed – guitar synthesizer, bowed guitar, synthesizer, drum machine, bass guitar, vocals, illustrations
Damon Edge – synthesizer, guitar synthesizer, tape, drum machine, vocals, production, engineering, illustrations

Charts

References

External links 

 

1979 EPs
Chrome (band) EPs